Andropogon bentii is a species of grass in the family Poaceae. It is found only in the Socotra archipelago in the Indian Ocean, a part of Yemen. Its natural habitat is succulent and dwarf shrubland on limestone escarpments and plateaus.

References

bentii
Endemic flora of Socotra
Taxonomy articles created by Polbot